The Weist Apartments, located in northwest Portland, Oregon, are listed on the National Register of Historic Places.

See also
 National Register of Historic Places listings in Northwest Portland, Oregon

References

1905 establishments in Oregon
Colonial Revival architecture in Oregon
Residential buildings completed in 1905
Apartment buildings on the National Register of Historic Places in Portland, Oregon
Northwest Portland, Oregon